"Perfect" is a song by American rapper Logic from his sixth studio album No Pressure (2020). It was sent to rhythmic contemporary radio on August 11, 2020. The song features uncredited vocals from rapper Juicy J, and was produced by 6ix, FnZ and Keanu Beats. The official remix of the song was released on September 24, 2021, featuring American rappers Lil Wayne and ASAP Ferg.

Composition
The song contains an instrumental of "kick-snare patterns" and a "trunk-thumping, throwback Memphis beat", as well as a vocal sample from Street Fighter II. Tim Hoffman of Riff Magazine described Logic's flow in the song as reminiscent of "Humble" by Kendrick Lamar.

Remix
In September 2020, a remix was hinted when Logic, in a comment on Twitter, wrote that Def Jam Recordings refused to pay Lil Wayne for a guest verse on the remix to "Perfect". However, the remix was leaked online months later and was eventually released on September 24, 2021. It features new verses from Lil Wayne and ASAP Ferg.

The remix received generally positive reviews from music critics; Jon Powell of Revolt wrote, "To no one's surprise, all artists are effortlessly able to match each other's energy with otherworldly bars and off-the-wall subject matter".

Credits and personnel
Credits adapted from Tidal.

 Logic – vocals, songwriting
 6ix – production, songwriting
 FnZ
 Michael Mule – production, songwriting
 Isaac De Boni – production, songwriting
 Keanu Beats – production, songwriting
 Anna Elyse – additional vocals
 Juicy J – uncredited additional vocals
 Bobby Campbell – mixing, recording, studio personnel

Charts

References

2020 singles
2020 songs
Logic (rapper) songs
Songs written by Logic (rapper)
Songs written by 6ix (record producer)
Def Jam Recordings singles